Max Deegan is an Irish rugby union player for Pro14 and European Rugby Champions Cup side Leinster. He plays primarily as a number 8, though can also play at flanker.

Leinster
Deegan was promoted to Leinster's senior squad ahead of the 2017–18 season, having made three appearances for the province during the previous season.

Ireland
Deegan was named Player of the Tournament for his part in helping Ireland Under-20s reach their first ever final during the 2016 World Rugby Under 20 Championship. Deegan received his first call up to the senior Ireland squad on 15 January 2020 for the 2020 Six Nations Championship and gained his first senior cap against Wales on the 8 February 2020. In 2022 Deegan captained two of Emerging Ireland's three tour matches in South Africa scoring one try.

References

External links
Leinster Profile
Pro14 Profile

Ireland Profile

1996 births
Living people
Rugby union players from Dublin (city)
Irish rugby union players
Lansdowne Football Club players
Leinster Rugby players
Ireland international rugby union players
Rugby union number eights
Rugby union flankers